Daniszewo may refer to the following places in Poland:

 Daniszewo, Płock County
 Daniszewo, Ostrołęka County